Thure de Thulstrup (April 5, 1848 – June 9, 1930), born Bror Thure Thulstrup in Sweden, was a leading American illustrator with contributions for numerous magazines, including three decades of work for Harper's Weekly. Thulstrup primarily illustrated historical military scenes.

Background
Thulstrup was born in Stockholm, Sweden. His father was Sweden's Secretary of the Navy amongst other such positions. After graduating from the Royal Swedish Military Academy, Thulstrup joined the Swedish military as an artillery officer at the age of twenty. However, he soon left Sweden for Paris, where he joined the French Foreign Legion and saw service in the Franco-Prussian War. Thulstrup also served in the French part of Northern Africa as a member of the First Zouave Regiment.

Career

After leaving the French Army, Thulstrup moved to Canada in 1872 to become a civil engineer. He moved to the United States in 1873, where he became an artist for the New York Daily Graphic, and, later, Frank Leslie's Illustrated Newspaper, documenting local events. As his skills improved, he became able to move into more and more prestigious roles, including work for Century, Harper's Monthly, and Scribner's Magazine. While living in New York, Thulstrup studied at the Art Students League. His military pictures include a series of paintings depicting the American Civil War, and illustrations of a Virginian lifestyle in the middle of the eighteenth century.

Thulstrup primarily illustrated historical military scenes, and was praised by one of his publishers, Louis Prang, as "the foremost military artist in America", a sentiment echoed by other contemporary critics. He also illustrated various other subjects.

Personal life

Thulstrup married Lucie Bavoillot in 1879. He died on June 9, 1930, leaving behind no children, and no personal papers of his have survived. Following his death, his illustrations have been labeled as "some of the most familiar scenes of American life now extant".

Gallery

References

Further reading
 B., J., "Bror Thure Thulstrup", in Dictionary of American Biography, Vol. XVIII, 1936, pp. 512–13.
 H., P.G., "Thure de Thulstrup", The Book Buyer, Vol. XII, 1895, pp. 439–41,
 Harrington, Peter, "Thure de Thulstrup", Military Illustrated, No. 75, August 1994, pp. 34–35.
 Maxwell, Perriton, "A painter in black and white", The Quarterly Illustrator, Vol. 1, Jan-March 1893, pp. 48–55.
 Obituary, The New York Times, June 10, 1930, p. 27.
 "The Work of Thure de Thulstrup," Truth, Vol. XVIII, No. 1, January 1899, pp. 3–5.

External links

 
 
 

1848 births
1930 deaths
Swedish emigrants to the United States
French military personnel of the Franco-Prussian War
Artists from Stockholm
Swedish illustrators
Burials at Green-Wood Cemetery
19th-century war artists
Soldiers of the French Foreign Legion
American war artists
Swedish war artists
French war artists
19th-century Swedish artists 
20th-century Swedish artists
20th-century American artists